All in the Game is the debut album by rapper Crime Boss. It was released on February 7, 1995, through Suave House Records, with production handled by T-Mix and 8Ball & MJG.

The album found mild success, peaking at 113 on the Billboard 200 and 11 on the Top R&B/Hip-Hop Albums. "The Chick" was released as a single and had a music video shot for it, but it did not reach the Billboard charts. 8Ball & MJG and South Circle are featured throughout track

Track listing
 "Intro" – 1:22
 "All In The Game" – 3:45
 "Put Em Up" – 5:26
 "Story Goes" – 4:02 ft. 8-Ball
 "Fry" – 1:55
 "Big Chiefing" – 4:29 ft. Rodney Ellis
 "Recognize" – 4:14
 "Dreaming" – 4:40
 "Point of No Return" – 5:10 ft. South Circle
 "The Click" – 5:05 ft. MJG
 "Going Off" – 3:37
 "Come And Get Some (Outro)" – 5:03

Charts

Weekly charts

Year-end charts

References

External links
All in the Game at Discogs
[ All in the Game] at Billboard

1995 debut albums
Crime Boss (rapper) albums